Trevor Jones is a Canadian politician, who was elected to the Legislative Assembly of Ontario in the 2022 provincial election. He represents the riding of Chatham-Kent—Leamington as a member of the Progressive Conservative Party of Ontario.

Jones was previously a town councillor in Leamington, Ontario

References 

Living people
Progressive Conservative Party of Ontario MPPs
21st-century Canadian politicians
Ontario municipal councillors
People from Leamington, Ontario
Year of birth missing (living people)